Justin Robinson (born August 14, 1968) is an American alto saxophonist. He has performed with artists such as the Harper Brothers, Cecil Brooks III, Abbey Lincoln, Diana Ross, Little Jimmy Scott, the Carnegie Hall Jazz Band, the Dizzy Gillespie All Star Band and was a member of the quintet and big band of trumpeter Roy Hargrove.

Life and career 
Robinson was born in Manhattan, and first began playing saxophone at the age of 13, while attending the High School of Music and Arts (LaGuardia High School) in New York. His first influences were Charlie Parker and Jackie McLean.

He first stepped on the stage of the  Village Gate in the show First Generations of Jazz. From 1984 to 1986 he belonged to the McDonald's High School Jazz Band where he met Philip Harper and at the age of 18 joined the Harper Brothers with Winard Harper. In 1988 he joined Betty Carter’s band. Starting in the early 1990s, he played with Cecil Brooks III, Abbey Lincoln, Diana Ross, Little Jimmy Scott, Carnegie Hall Jazz Band, the Dizzy Gillespie All Star Band, Kate Higgins, Sam Newsome and especially Roy Hargrove, both in his big band and quintet.  His debut recording project  Justin Time (Verve, 1991), was produced by Bobby Watson and featured Eddie Henderson, Kenny Barron and Gary Bartz among others. On 1998’s  Challenge he was accompanied by his childhood friend Stephen Scott. Robinson lives in New Jersey.

Discography 
 1991: Justin Time (Verve)
 1998: The Challenge (Arabesque)
 2012: In the Spur of the Moment (WJ3)
 2014: Alana's Fantasy (Criss Cross Jazz)
 2019: At First Light (WJ3)
With Cecil Brooks III
Hangin' with Smooth (Muse, 1990)
With Roy Hargrove
 2006: Nothing Serious (Verve)
 2008: Earfood (EmArcy)
 2009: Emergence – The Roy Hargrove Big Band (Groovin' High)

References 
 Justin Robinson, all-about-jazz

Specific

American male saxophonists
Living people
1968 births
21st-century American saxophonists
21st-century American male musicians
WJ3 Records artists
Verve Records artists
Criss Cross Jazz artists
Arabesque Records artists